Philoxenus or Philoxenos (Greek for "lover of foreigners" or "hospitable") is the name of several prominent ancient Greeks:

Philoxenus of Cythera, an ancient Greek dithyrambic poet
Philoxenus of Leucas, a legendary glutton
King Philoxenus, an Indo-Greek king
Philoxenus (general), a Macedonian general who was one of the Diadochi
Philoxenus (physician), ancient Greek physician
Philoxenus of Mabbug (d. 523), Syriac writer and proponent of Miaphysitism
Philoxenus of Eretria, Hellenistic painter